Roosevelt's World War I volunteers was a proposed military volunteer formation of Americans to fight in France for the Allies.

Background
In his book Foes of Our Own Household  (1917), Theodore Roosevelt explains that he had authorization from Congress to raise four divisions to fight in France, similar to his earlier Rough Riders, the 1st United States Volunteer Cavalry Regiment and to the British Army 25th (Frontiersmen) Battalion, Royal Fusiliers.  He had selected eighteen officers (including Seth Bullock, Frederick Russell Burnham, James Rudolph Garfield, John M. Parker, and Henry L. Stimson) and directed them to actively recruit volunteer troops shortly after the United States entered the war.  With the help of John Hays Hammond, the New York-based Rocky Mountain Club enlisted Major Burnham to raise the troops in the Western states and to coordinate recruitment efforts.  Wilson ultimately rejected Roosevelt's plan and the volunteer Army disbanded.

After several months of correspondence with Newton D. Baker, Secretary of War, Roosevelt sent this telegram to President Woodrow Wilson:

President Wilson, as Commander-in-chief, sent back this response:

Roosevelt then sent the following to the men who had volunteered for immediate service on the firing line in the Divisions which Congress authorized:

A few days later, Roosevelt sent this letter to all the men who had done work in personally raising units for the proposed Divisions which had been authorized by Congress:

In his correspondence with President Wilson and the Secretary of War, Roosevelt did not mention the fact that he was planning to recruit at least one regiment, and perhaps a brigade (two regiments) of African-American troops for the division. He discussed plans for raising and equipping such a unit with F. S. Stover, a wealthy Philadelphia businessman who was raising funds for the proposed division.

In May, 1917, while he waited for Wilson's response to his proposal, he offered command of the regiment (or the brigade, if one were formed) to Lieutenant Colonel Charles Young, the senior African-American officer in the Regular Army, a friend and associate of W.E.B. DuBois, and author of a systematic study of the cultural bases of military power, The Military Morale of Races and Nations (1912). Roosevelt had known Young since 1901, had great respect for his talents, and in 1904 had appointed him to the newly formed Military Intelligence Division of the General Staff. On May 8, 1917 Young had written to ask Roosevelt's help in opposing the Army's effort to force his retirement for supposed medical reasons. In fact, the army wanted to avoid having to give Young the kind of active-service appointment his rank and experience entitled him to, because the army wished to avoid any situation in which White officers might have to take orders from a senior Black officer. Roosevelt's response was to offer him command of the proposed regiment or brigade:  "there is not another man [than yourself] who would be better fitted to command such a regiment." He also promised Young "carte blanche" in appointing staff and line officers for the unit.

He then wrote to Stover, telling him to "communicate with Lieutenant Colonel Young, the colored United States Officer, a thoroughly fine fellow. It seems to me he should command your regiment if it is raised. I would love to have [the regiment] with me if the President lets me go." On May 30, Young thanked Stover for giving him the opportunity to command "a regiment of my own people," and added: "I know men of high character and efficiency who could make good in these positions and do honor to themselves, their race, country, and to yourself [Stover] as the Organizer of the regiment." All these plans came to nothing when Wilson refused Roosevelt permission to organize his volunteer division. Young was retired for medical reasons during the war, then reappointed to active duty after it was over. Nevertheless, the proposal indicates a change in Roosevelt's racial attitudes, perhaps influenced by the persuasive scientific and sociological arguments of Young's book.

In fiction

In the alternate history story Over There by Mike Resnick, Roosevelt managed to blackmail Wilson into letting him raise a revived force of Rough Riders and take it to France, but Wilson ordered General Pershing keep them away from the front and avoid any chance of Roosevelt getting killed. Disobeying orders and determined to recreate his glorious moment of San Juan Hill, Roosevelt led his men to a completely aggressive  and victorious  head-on attack on entrenched German machine-gun positions, capturing the enemy’s position. On hearing of his courageous actions, President Wilson said "He is one of the greatest Americans in history, America is waiting for his return... His actions will always be remembered".

References

 The Foes of Our Own Household, by Theodore Roosevelt (1917)
"Military Morale of Races and Nations," by Charles Young (1912)
"Lost Battalions: The Great War and the Crisis of American Nationality" by Richard Slotkin (2005)

Military units and formations of the United States in World War I
20th-century military history of the United States
Theodore Roosevelt